is a former Japanese football player.

Playing career
Hara was born in Satsumasendai on September 6, 1979. After graduating from high school, he joined J1 League club Cerezo Osaka in 1998. He debuted in 2000 and the club won the 2nd place 2001 Emperor's Cup. However the club results were bad in league competition in 2001 and was relegated to J2 League from 2002. From 2002, he played many matches as defensive midfielder and side midfielder. The club returned to J1 in a year and won the 2nd place 2003 Emperor's Cup. In 2004, he moved to Yokohama F. Marinos. Although he played 2 seasons, he could hardly play in the match. In 2006, he moved to J2 club Vissel Kobe. However he could hardly play in the match. In October 2006, he moved to Japan Football League club SC Tottori. He retired end of 2006 season.

Club statistics

References

External links

1979 births
Living people
Association football people from Kagoshima Prefecture
Japanese footballers
J1 League players
J2 League players
Japan Football League players
Cerezo Osaka players
Yokohama F. Marinos players
Vissel Kobe players
Gainare Tottori players
Association football midfielders